Miguel Dungo III (born January 23, 1965) is a Filipino–American former professional tennis player.

Dungo, the son of Philippines Davis Cup player Miguel Jr, grew up in New York City.

A graduate of Bryant High School in Long Island, Dungo turned professional in 1988 and counts Marty Davis amongst his best tour wins. He featured in qualifying draws for Wimbledon and the US Open. In 1989 he represented the Philippines Davis Cup team in ties against China and New Zealand, winning one of his four singles rubbers.

ATP Challenger finals

Doubles: 1 (0–1)

References

External links
 
 
 

1965 births
Living people
Filipino male tennis players
American sportspeople of Filipino descent
Tennis people from New York (state)
Sportspeople from New York City
American male tennis players